The 1966 Peru earthquake occurred on October 17 at 16:41 local time (21:41 UTC). It had a magnitude of  8.1. The epicenter was located offcoast near Huacho. About 100 people were reported dead. Most of the damage was recorded in low buildings. Cracks were reported in higher buildings. The maximum Mercalli intensity (MMI) was MMI IX in San Nicolás, MMI VIII in Huacho, and MMI VII in Callao. Landslides and huge ground cracks were reported along the Pan-American Highway north of Ancón.

See also 
List of earthquakes in 1966
List of earthquakes in Peru

References

External links 

The source mechanism of the earthquake and tsunami of October 17, 1966 in Peru – George Pararas-Carayannis

Peru earthquake, 1966
Megathrust earthquakes in Peru
1966 in Peru
Tsunamis in Peru
1966 tsunamis
1966 disasters in Peru